Río Grande (Spanish for "great river") is a river located in Malargüe Department of southwestern Mendoza Province, Argentina. It arises in the confluence of the rivers Cobre and Tordillo on the Andes range near Chile and ends at the Colorado River at the Neuquén Province border.

Around exists untouched earth, but the local government plans to take advantage of its resources.

Tributaries

Right margin:
Cobre River, Santa Elena Stream, De las Cargas Stream, Tiburcio Stream, Valenzuela River, Montañez River, Del Yeso Stream, El Seguro Stream, Los Ángeles Stream, Pichú Trolón Stream, Chico River and Potimalal River 
Left margin:
Tordillo River, De la Pampa Stream, Del Infiernillo Stream, Del Totoral Stream, Carilaufquen Stream, De la Yesera Stream, Chacai-có Stream, Chequenco Stream and Agua Botada Stream

External links
Works in southern Mendoza - Trasvase Río Grande (in Spanish)

Rivers of Mendoza Province
Rivers of Argentina